Jayme Lee Mata (born 17 December 1982 in Oranjestad, Aruba) is an Aruban judoka. At the 2012 Summer Olympics he competed in the Men's 66 kg, but was defeated in the second round by Sugoi Uriarte. At the 2016 Summer Olympics, Mata won his first Olympic match by defeating Joe Mahit in the second round of the Men's 66 kg but lost to Rishod Sobirov in the third round. He lives in Arnhem, the Netherlands.

References

Aruban male judoka
Living people
Olympic judoka of Aruba
Judoka at the 2012 Summer Olympics
Judoka at the 2016 Summer Olympics
People from Oranjestad, Aruba
1982 births